Imad Moustapha (born 11 March 1959) is the Syrian Ambassador to China and his country's former Ambassador to the United States.

Biography
Imad Moustapha was born in Aleppo on 11 March 1952.

He was Dean of the Faculty of Information Technology (IT) at the University of Damascus, and Secretary General of the Arab School on Science and Technology. He is a co-founder of the Network of Syrian Scientists, Technologists and Innovators Abroad (NOSSTIA). This organization was involved in establishing Meedan, "a non-profit social technology company which aims to increase cross-language interaction on the web, with particular emphasis on translation and aggregation services in Arabic and English."

Media
Imad Moustapha regularly writes in the print media and appears on television, representing the Syrian government position.  He has also occasionally appeared at public lectures, think-tanks, and world-affairs councils.

Personal
His wide range of interests include: globalization, cultural identities, social and economic impacts of the Internet, and Western classical music.

Allegations of espionage
On June 25, 2011, the Washington Bureau chief of a major Kuwait newspaper (Al Rai), reported in NOW Lebanon that Ambassador Mustapha is engaged in various espionage activities, as well as threats to Syrians living in the US.

See also
 University of Damascus
 United Nations Development Program
 United Nations Educational, Scientific and Cultural Organization (UNESCO)
 United Nations Economic and Social Commission for Western Asia

References

External links

 Imad Moustapha discusses The U.S., Syria and the New Old Middle East: Confrontation or Cooperation?
 The Washington Diplomat Newspaper - Ambassador Profile 
 Murder in Abou Kamal
 (Other information in this article as of 26 August 2006 is from Imad Moustapha's personal blog - https://web.archive.org/web/20100105115626/http://imad_moustapha.blogs.com/ - Accessed 19 June 2006. And from Forward Magazine where he is a regular contributing writer.)

1952 births
People from Aleppo
Damascus University alumni
Alumni of the University of Surrey
Ambassadors of Syria to the United States
Ambassadors of Syria to China
Living people